Aeglothrips is a genus of thrips in the family Phlaeothripidae.

Species
 Aeglothrips denticulus

References

Phlaeothripidae
Thrips genera